Vasa is a village in Sirohi District in Rajasthan state in India. It is 9 km from Swarupganj and 25 km from Abu Road and also known as Vasantpur or Vasantgarh. Vasa also has got a temple Laxminarayan Mandir whose foundation stone was laid by Mirabai.

History

Vasa fell within a Princely Village before Indian Independence in 1947, and was ruled by the Parmar Rajput dynasty (one of the major Rajput clan of Rajasthan and Madhya Pradesh) under British dominion. Vasa was established by Sher Singh Parmar in the twelfth century. The last ruler was Thakur Sardar Singh (1927). The royal family of Parmar worship Sun or Surya Narayan Dev as their kuldevta, whose temple is also there in the village.

Geography
Vasa Mere than a mile to the north-east of Rohera is the village of Rajasthan, on the outskirt of which is a fine temple of Surya (the sun god) of the eleventh or twelfth century. The village itself has various temples.

Vasa is famous for its sun temple, Jambeshwar Mahadev temple, vav ( Stepwell of Vasa ), Jamdgani Rushi Ashram and many other old temples. The sun temple is also called Surya Narayana mandir and was built in the twelfth century, as was the vav(stepwell).

References

 (1) Rajasthan [district Gazetteers].: Sirohi published and Printed at Government of India Central Press, 1967, refer page 12,202 and 441
 (2) Book : Identity, Gender, and Poverty: New Perspectives on Caste and Tribe in Rajasthan : By Maya Unnithan-Kumar
 (3) Temples of Rajasthan, by  Ramavallab Somani 
 (4) Sun Temple in vasa 
 (5) Created by Mr Parth Ketan Ojha , vasa Currently in Jaipur.

External links
 
 Vasa at Gorwal.com
 Vasa at toolserver.org/~geohack

Villages in Sirohi district
Tourist attractions in Sirohi district